L-160 can refer to:
Aero L-160 Brigadyr, a Czech utility aircraft
Bushcaddy L-160, a Canadian kit aircraft